Tyumen is a city in Russia.

Tyumen may also refer to:
Tyumen Oblast, a federal subject of Russia
Tyumen Urban Okrug, a municipal formation which the City of Tyumen in Tyumen Oblast, Russia is incorporated as
Tyumen (inhabited locality), several inhabited localities in Russia
FC Tyumen, an association football club based in Tyumen, Russia
MFK Tyumen, a futsal club based in Tyumen, Russia

See also
 Tumen (disambiguation)
 Tyumensky (disambiguation)